Sir Francis William Maclean  (13 December 1844 – 11 November 1913) was an English barrister and Liberal Party politician 
who sat in the House of Commons from 1885 to 1891.

Maclean was the third son of Alexander Maclean, of Barrow Hedges, Carshalton, Surrey.  He was educated at Westminster School and at Trinity College, Cambridge. He was called to the bar at Inner Temple in 1868.

In 1885 Maclean was elected Member of Parliament for Woodstock. He became a Liberal Unionist member following the ructions of 1886.  He held the seat until his resignation in 1891.

Maclean was made a Q.C. in 1886. After resigning his seat he was Master in Lunacy until 1896, becoming a bencher in 1892. From 1896 to 1909 he was Chief Justice of Bengal. He was knighted in 1896, appointed K.C.I.E. in 1898,  and awarded the Kaisar-i-Hind Medal in 1900. His career in India included the chairmanship of famine relief committees in 1897, 1900 and 1907, as well as a short spell as Vice-Chancellor of the University of Calcutta between 1898 and 1900.

Maclean resided latterly in London and died at the age of 68.

Maclean married Mattie Sowerby of Benwell Tower, Northumberland in August 1869. Their son, Montague Francis Maclean, was a leading figure in the coal industry.

References

External links 
 

1844 births
1913 deaths
People educated at Westminster School, London
Alumni of Trinity College, Cambridge
People from Carshalton
Knights Commander of the Order of the Indian Empire
Liberal Party (UK) MPs for English constituencies
Recipients of the Kaisar-i-Hind Medal
Vice Chancellors of the University of Calcutta
Liberal Unionist Party MPs for English constituencies
UK MPs 1885–1886
UK MPs 1886–1892
19th-century King's Counsel
Chief Justices of the Calcutta High Court
British India judges
Masters of the High Court (England and Wales)